Kupetrechus is a genus of beetles in the family Carabidae, containing the following species:

 Kupetrechus gracilis Townsend, 2010
 Kupetrechus lamberti (Britton, 1960)
 Kupetrechus larsonae Townsend, 2010

References

Trechinae